Homeobox A cluster is a protein that in humans is encoded by the HOXA@ gene.

References

Further reading